Patriarch John X may refer to:

 John X bar Mawdyono, Syriac Patriarch of Antioch in 1129–1137
 John X of Constantinople, Ecumenical Patriarch in 1198–1206
 Pope John X of Alexandria, Pope of Alexandria & Patriarch of the See of St. Mark in 1363–1369
 John X, 55th Maronite Patriarch in 1648–1656
 Patriarch John X of Antioch (ruled since 2012)